Hwangbo Seung-hee (Korean: 황보승희, born 5 August 1976) is a South Korean politician serving as the Youth Chief of the People Power Party (PPP) since 2020. She is also the Member of the National Assembly for Central-Yeongdo since 2020. Prior to these, she was a member of the Yeongdo District Council and the Busan Metropolitan Council.

Early life and education 
Hwangbo was born in Yeongdo, Busan in 1976. Her father was from Guryongpo, Pohang. She is the eldest daughter of the one son and two daughters of her parents.

She attended Yeongdo Girls' High School before studying English at Ewha Womans University. She used to serve as the President of the Student Council during her secondary school life. Following the graduation, she worked at an English language tuition centre and a foreign company.

Political career 

Hwangbo joined politics in December 1999 as a secretary to the then Yeongdo MP Kim Hyong-o, which she served for 8 months.

In 2004, Hwangbo joined protests against the impeachment of the then President Roh Moo-hyun. However, she joined the Grand National Party (GNP), which voted in favour of the impeachment. She said that she was willing to change the party. Shortly after this, she contested as the Member of the Yeongdo District Council for A constituency (including Yeongson 2-dong) at the 2004 by-elections. She was just 28 years old at that time, making her as the youngest counciler of the country. She was re-elected in 2006 and 2010, but resigned in 2012 in order to contest for Busan Metropolitan Council at the 2012 by-elections.

She stepped down as a Busan Metropolitan Councilor on 20 March 2018 in order to contest for the Yeongdo District mayorship at the 2018 local elections. Nevertheless, she was defeated by the Democratic candidate Kim Chul-hoon amid the high popularity of Moon Jae-in government and the public anger towards the Liberty Korea Party (LKP). The LKP faced crushing defeats in Busan, where its mayorship was also won by the Democratic candidate Oh Keo-don.

In the 2020 election, Hwangbo contested for Central-Yeongdo, after the then incumbent Kim Moo-sung decided to not seek re-election. She received 47,436 votes and defeated Kim Bi-o with a margin of 6,351 votes. She has also become the first female MP for the constituency.

On 6 December 2020, the People Power Party (PPP) officially established its youth-wing, named the Youth People Power Party (Youth PPP). Hwangbo was elected its new chairman.

She was considered a potential candidate for vice presidency of the PPP at the 2021 leadership election, but did not run. On 12 June, after Lee Jun-seok was elected party President, she was appointed Chief Spokesperson of the party.

Personal life 
Hwangbo was married to Cho Sung-hwa; the couple has 2 children.

Election results

General elections

Local elections

Mayor of Yeongdo

Busan Metropolitan Council

Yeongdo District Council

References

External links 
 Official blog
 Hwangbo Seung-hee on Facebook

1976 births
Living people
South Korean politicians